Akashiya is a surname. Notable people with the surname include:

Sanma Akashiya (born 1955), Japanese comedian, television personality, and actor
Moka Akashiya, fictional character